Qu Yi (born 9 November 1992) is a Chinese musical actor.

Biography 
Qu Yi was born in Huaihua, Hunan Province in 1992. He graduated from the Performing Arts Department of Shenyang Conservatory of Music. Influenced by  his family, he studied opera, folk dance, Latin dance, hosting, performance and piano when he was young, and then received professional vocal training.

His musical works include: the Chinese version of musical Journey Under the Midnight Sun (adapted from a Japanese  mystery novel『白夜行』written by Keigo Higashino, cooperated with Han Xue and Liu Lingfei), the Chinese version of musical Rimbaud, musical Non-stop Sorrow adapted from Jerry Huang's song (the same name), the Chinese version of musical Rock of Ages (cooperated with Zheng Yunlong)， the Chinese version of musical Vincent Van Gogh directed by Hong Kong stage director Desmond Wai-Kit Tang (鄧偉傑),  musical Secret adapted from Jay Chou's movie (the same name),  original musical Law Poem - Lei Jingtian which is a rare law topic musical in China,  domestic original musical Love Because Of Taste,  little theater musical Music Cooking Show,  campus musical Exchange Students and musical Hidden Addict.

Musical work

Discography 
 Song Miserable Love (Chinese Title:《千刀万剐的爱》), episode of Musical Vincent Van Gogh, cooperated with musical actor Mao Haifei, 2017
 Song To.Vincent van Gogh, episode of Musical Vincent Van Gogh, 2017
 Song Draw a Real Life (Chinese Title:《画出写实人生》), episode of Musical Vincent Van Gogh, cooperated with musical actor Mao Haifei, 2017
Song Moonlight (Chinese Title:《皓月》), episode of Musical Rimbaud, adapted from Paul Verlaine's poem(the same name), cooperated with musical actor Sun Douer, 2019

Radio and TV program 
 Shanghai Traffic Station FM 105.7, Flying Arts ( Chinese Title:《艺点欣飞扬》), Sept 30th 2016, Sing Today, Happy in Arts (Chinese Title: 《今天来唱歌，快乐在艺起》)
 Shanghai Traffic Station FM 105.7, Flying Arts ( Chinese Title:《艺点欣飞扬》), Sept 20th 2017, Wonderful Music - Van Gogh is Coming (Chinese Title: 《音乐美好，梵高来了》)
National Treasure (Chinese: 国家宝藏), a Chinese cultural exploration reality TV program that aired on China Central Television, Season One, Jan 28th 2018, Chapter Jade Cong (玉琮), played a role as clansman of Liangchu Tribe, cooperated with Zhou Dongyu
Central People's Broadcasting Station FM106.6, Art Talk (Chinese Title:《文艺大家谈》),  Aug 17th 2019

References

External links 
 Qu Yi's Microblog (Weibo)
 Qu Yi's Homepage on Xiami Music

1992 births
Living people
People from Huaihua
Shenyang Conservatory of Music alumni
Male actors from Hunan
Singers from Hunan
21st-century Chinese male singers